Christopher Isham (born 28 April 1944), usually cited as Chris J. Isham, is a theoretical physicist at Imperial College London.

Research
Isham's main research interests are quantum gravity and foundational studies in quantum theory. He was the inventor of  an approach to temporal quantum logic called the HPO formalism, and has worked on loop quantum gravity and quantum geometrodynamics. Together with other physicists, such as John C. Baez, Isham is known as a proponent of the utility of category theory in theoretical physics. In recent years, since at least 1997, he has been working on a
new approach to quantum theory based on topos theory.

Isham has appeared in several NOVA television programmes as well as a film about Stephen Hawking. Physicist Paul Davies has described Isham as "Britain's greatest quantum gravity expert." As a practising Christian, Isham has also written about the relationships among philosophy, theology, and physics.

Awards
 2011: Dirac Medal for his works on quantum gravity.

Bibliography
 Isham, C. J., Physics, Philosophy, and Theology, 1988
 Christopher Isham, "Quantum Theories of the Creation of the Universe," in R. Russell, N. Murphy and C. J. Isham (eds.), Quantum Cosmology and the Laws of Nature (Vatican City: Vatican Press, 1993), p. 74.
 Christopher Isham, "Creation of the Universe as a Quantum Tunnelling Process," in (eds. R. J. Russell et al.), Physics, Philosophy and Theology (Vatican City: Vatican Press, 1988), pp. 375–408.
 Isham, C. J. (1993), "Canonical Quantum Gravity and the Problem of Time", in L. A. Ibort and M. A. Rodríguez (eds.), Integrable Systems, Quantum Groups, and Quantum Field theories. Dordrecht: Kluwer Academic Publishers, 157-288.
 Isham, C. J., K. V. Kuchař, "Representations Of Space-Time Diffeomorphisms. 2. Canonical Geometrodynamics," Annals of Physics 164:316 (1985).
 Isham, C. J. (1994), Prima facie questions in quantum gravity, in Ehlers and Friedrich 25 (1994), 1-21.
 Isham, C. J. (1997), “Structural Issues in Quantum Gravity”, in M. Francaviglia et al. (eds.), Florence 1995, General Relativity and Gravitation, World Scientific.
 Butterfield, Jeremy, and Chris Isham (1999), “On the Emergence of Time in Quantum Gravity”, in Butterfield (1999), 111-168.
 Butterfield, Jeremy, and Christopher Isham (2001), “Spacetime and the Philosophical Challenge of Quantum Gravity”, in Craig Callender and Nick Huggett (eds.) (2001), 33-89.
 Döring, Andreas and Isham, Chris, "What is a Thing?: Topos Theory in the Foundations of Physics", in Bob Coecke, New Structures in Physics, Chapter 13, pp. 753–940, Lecture Notes in Physics, 813, Springer, 2011, (also see )

See also
List of quantum gravity researchers
List of Christian thinkers in science

References

Living people
British physicists
Academics of Imperial College London
Donegall Lecturers of Mathematics at Trinity College Dublin
Members of the International Society for Science and Religion
British Christians
1944 births
Deans of the Imperial College Faculty of Natural Sciences